The Journal of Chinese Religions (JCR) is a leading specialist journal in the field of Chinese religions. From 1975 to 1982, it was known as Society for the Study of Chinese Religions Bulletin. Since its founding, JCR has provided a forum for studies in Chinese religions from a great variety of disciplinary perspectives, including religious studies, philology, history, art history, anthropology, sociology, political science, archaeology, and literary studies.

Abstracting and indexing
JCR is abstracted and indexed in the Bibliography of Asian Studies, EBSCOhost, Emerging Sources Citation Index, ProQuest, and Scopus.

References

External links

Chinese studies journals
Annual journals
English-language journals
Publications established in 1972